Benjamin "Ben" Goodrich (born 26 November 1992) is an American Paralympic judoka. He competed in the Men's 100 kg event in the 2021 Tokyo Paralympics where he won a silver medal. He also participated in the 2016 Rio Paralympic Games as a member of Team USA. 

His fiancé Nicolina Pernheim is also a Paralympic judoka, they got engaged in 2020 and are now married.

References

1992 births
Living people
Paralympic judoka of the United States
American male judoka
Sportspeople from Saint Paul, Minnesota
University of Minnesota alumni
Judoka at the 2016 Summer Paralympics
Judoka at the 2020 Summer Paralympics
Medalists at the 2020 Summer Paralympics
Medalists at the 2019 Parapan American Games
20th-century American people
21st-century American people